Paul Edmunds (born 2 December 1957) is an English former professional footballer and manager.

Playing career
A pacy winger, Edmunds trained as a teacher in Sunderland and was called into Great Britain's 1979 World Student Games squad. From here he was spotted by Leicester City and signed as a professional.

Edmunds made his debut against Sunderland at Roker Park, then scored in his first home game against Shrewsbury Town.

While playing for Leicester Edmunds broke his wrist in a challenge from Joey Jones and was released in 1981 after suffering further injuries. He was signed by AFC Bournemouth but released again after a single season.

Coaching career
In 1983 Edmunds began working at a school alongside Sheila Stocks, the founder and captain of Doncaster Belles. After the pair became an item, Edmunds attended pre-season training with the Belles in 1984. When he criticised their methods, he was challenged to do better and found himself coaching at the club. Edmunds married Sheila in 1986 and took over as Doncaster Belles manager the following year.

At the time Doncaster Belles were the pre-eminent women's football team in England, who reached 11 FA Cup finals out of twelve from 1983 to 1994.

Edmunds resigned in 1995 after heavily criticising the Football Association's running of the women's game and the efforts of then-England women manager Ted Copeland.

References

External links
Doncaster Rovers Belles Past Managers
Paul Edmunds at Where Are They Now?

1957 births
Living people
Footballers from Doncaster
English footballers
Leicester City F.C. players
AFC Bournemouth players
Bentley Victoria Welfare F.C. players
Grantham Town F.C. players
Burton Albion F.C. players
Goole Town F.C. players
Armthorpe Welfare F.C. players
English Football League players
English football managers
Doncaster Rovers Belles L.F.C. managers
Association football midfielders